Marianne Cohn (17 September 1922, in Mannheim – 8 July 1944, in Haute-Savoie), was a German-born French Resistance fighter.

Biography
Marianne Cohn was the eldest child of a family of German intellectuals of Jewish descent, but they did not practice Judaism and had little connection to the Jewish community of Germany. The family left Germany, eventually settling in France where Marianne's parents were deported to the Gurs internment camp, as German nationals. She and her sister were taken in by the Jewish Scouts organization, with the opportunity to rediscover their Jewish identity.

In 1942 Marianne began to smuggle Jewish children out of France. Threatened with deportation, she was incarcerated at Nice and released three months later. It was during this initial detention in 1943, she wrote her famous poem "Je trahirai demain" (I shall betray tomorrow):

After her release she resumed her underground activities, supervising children before their departure for Switzerland. Later, in January 1944, she began working with Rolande Birgy (see French Wikipedia article), shuttling two or three groups, each with up to twenty children across the southern border, passing through Lyons and Annecy. Birgy had been teamed with Mila Racine (see French Wikipedia article) before she was arrested on 21 October 1943.

Cohn was arrested on 31 May 1944 near Annemasse with a group of twenty-eight children, including Renee Bornstein and incarcerated at the Hotel Pax by the Gestapo. Despite the torture, she did not speak. Her resistance unit formed a plan to free her, but she refused, fearing reprisals on children. On the night of 8 July 1944 the Gestapo based in Lyons sent a team to Annemasse to remove six prisoners, including Cohn, and killed them in a forest near Ville-la-Grand by hitting them with clubs or rifle butts.

Commemoration 
On 7 November 1945, the French military government awarded Marianne Cohn posthumously with the war cross with silver star.
There is a school in Annemasse, a school in Berlin and a street in Ville-la-Grand bearing her name.

References

Bibliography
 Magali Renaud Ktorza, Marianne Cohn au service des enfants juifs, Éditions Ampelos, Paris, 2021, .
 Bruno Doucey, Si tu parles, Marianne, éd. Élytis, 2014
 Magali Ktorza, "Marianne Cohn, I betray tomorrow, not today, Revue d'histoire de la Shoah,No. 161, September–December 1997, pp. 96–112
 François Marcot, Robert Laffont (eds.), "Marianne Cohn", in: Dictionnaire historique de la Résistance, 2006,  pp. 392–393
 Croquet, Jean-Claude (1996). Chemins de passage: les passages clandestins entre la Haute-Savoie et la Suisse de 1940 à 1944, [exposition itinérante réalisée à Gaillard en 1995]. Saint-Julien-Genevois: La Salevienne. pp. 71–80

External links
 Doreen Rappaport, "Beyond Courage", jwmag.org; accessed 5 December 2016

1922 births
1944 deaths
French Resistance members
20th-century German Jews
Female resistance members of World War II
People from Mannheim
Resistance members killed by Nazi Germany
German torture victims
People from Baden-Württemberg executed by Nazi Germany
People executed by blunt trauma
Jews in the French resistance
German emigrants to France